WPB may refer to:
War Production Board, a US government agency in WWII
War Propaganda Bureau of Britain's Foreign Office in WWI
Weekly Playboy, Japanese men's magazine 
Weibel–Palade body, storage granules of endothelial cells 
West Palm Beach, Florida, United States, a city
World Painted Blood, a 2009 album by the thrash metal band Slayer
Waste paper basket
The hull classification symbol of an Island-class patrol boat of the US Coast Guard
Port Bergé Airport, Madagascar 
World Prison Brief, database of prison systems throughout the world 
Whizz Pop Bang, a science magazine for children

Political parties
Workers Party of Bangladesh
Workers' Party of Belgium
Workers Party of Britain